Konstantin Kravchuk and Łukasz Kubot didn't defend their 2009 title. Kubot chose to not play and Kravchuk (who partnered up with Lukáš Lacko) lost to more late champions - Pavel Chekhov and Alexey Kedryuk in the quarterfinals.
Chekhov and Kedryuk became the new masters, after their won against Pierre-Ludovic Duclos and Aisam-ul-Haq Qureshi in the final.

Seeds

Draw

Draw

References
 Doubles Draw

Fergana Challenger - Doubles
2009 Doubles